Dibutyl ether is a chemical compound belonging to the ether family with the molecular formula of . It is colorless, volatile, and flammable liquid and has peculiar ethereal smell.

Liquid dibutyl ether is lighter than water. On the other hand, the vapor is heavier than air. It is not soluble in water, but it is  soluble in acetone and many other organic solvents. Due to this property,  dibutyl ether is used as solvent in various chemical reactions and processes. For example, phenyllithium is commercially available as a ca. 1.8M solution in dibutyl ether.

Because of the formation of peroxides, it should be protected from heat, light and air.

Synthesis 
Dibutyl ether is obtained from dehydration of 1-butanol with sulfuric acid as a catalyst and dehydrating agent:

2 →  + 

Industrially, dibutyl ether can be obtained by dehydration of 1-butanol on alumina at 300 °C.

Reactions 
This compound is generally stable to oxidation, reduction, and base. Strong acids like HI and HBr can cleave this ether. In the presence of oxygen, dibutyl ether is oxidized to a  peroxide or hydroperoxide.

Applications
 Solvent for Grignard syntheses
 Solvent for fats, oils, organic acids, alkaloids, natural and synthetic resins
 For manufacturing of pesticides (e.g. cyhexatin)

References

Dialkyl ethers
Ether solvents
Symmetrical ethers
Sweet-smelling chemicals
Butyl compounds